Grant Shaud (born Edward Grant Shaud III; February 27, 1961) is an American actor known for his portrayal of the character of Miles Silverberg on the television sitcom Murphy Brown.

Early life
Edward Grant Shaud III was born in Evanston, Illinois, the son of Anna Barbara (née Dougherty) and Edward Shaud Jr. His family is Irish Catholic. He attended Conestoga High School in Berwyn, Pennsylvania, and graduated in 1979. In 1983, he graduated with a journalism degree from the University of Richmond, where he was a member of  Sigma Alpha Epsilon.

Career
In 1984, Shaud moved to New York City to begin working in theater. His first acting role in television was as a guest character named Jack on Kate & Allie, who was a college student and director on a local cable channel. In 1988, he began as Miles Silverberg on Murphy Brown. He lived with co-star Jane Leeves before and during her guest stint on the show, in which she concurrently played his girlfriend. He left in 1996 to pursue other projects, with his producer role on the show taken by Lily Tomlin. On February 26, 2018, it was announced that Shaud would return to a revival series of Murphy Brown with former co-stars Candice Bergen, Faith Ford and Joe Regalbuto.

In recent years, Shaud has done some voiceover work in animation, most notably the television series Batman: The Animated Series. He had a guest role on The Drew Carey Show as a character named Jack, who believed himself to be the devil. He also played Alex Rosetti on the sitcom Madigan Men, starring Gabriel Byrne.

Selected stage and screen credits

Television
 Kate & Allie (as cable channel director Jack in episodes "Stage Mother" and "The Goodbye Girl"), 1986
 Murphy Brown (as Miles Silverberg), 1988–1996, 2018
 Murder, She Wrote (in episode "Where Have You Gone, Billy Boy?" as ventriloquist Woody Perkins), 1990
 The Drew Carey Show (in episode "The Devil, You Say" as Jack), 1996
 Lois & Clark: The New Adventures of Superman (as Harold Kripstly/The Toyman in episode "Toy Story"), 1997
 Deadman's Gun ("Highway Man") 1997, Season 1, Episode 6
 From the Earth to the Moon (as Bob Carbee), 1998
 Godzilla: The Series (in episode "Talkin' Trash" as Dr. Felix Hoenikker), 1998
 The Wild Thornberrys (in episode "The Dragon and the Professor" as Mr. Culpepper), March 1999
 Madigan Men (as Alex Rosetti), 2000
 Touched by an Angel (in episode "The Sixteenth Minute" as Ed), 2002
 Oliver Beene (as Dr. Jeremiah 'Jerry' Beene), 2003
 Pushing Daisies 2007
 Law & Order (in episode "Misbegotten" as Dr. Hoffman), Jan 2008
 Medium (in episodes "Burn Baby Burn" and "Burn Baby Burn, Part 2" as Dr. Leo Crane), March, 2008
 Louie (as Eddie Faye, screenwriter in the re-write scene, in the episode "Halloween/Ellie"), August 18, 2011
 Curb Your Enthusiasm (in episode "Car Periscope" as Henry Horn), August 28, 2011
 Law & Order: Special Victims Unit  (in episode "Theater Tricks" as Theater critic), January 11, 2012
 The Good Wife  (in episode "Waiting for the Knock" as Judge Etts), October 28, 2012
 Younger  (in episodes "A Kiss Is Just a Kiss", "The Incident at Pound Ridge", "A Novel Marriage", "#LizaToo", and "A Christmas Miracle" as Bob Katz), 2016–2018

Film
 The Distinguished Gentleman as Arthur Reinhardt, 1992
 Men Seeking Women as Les, 1997
 Antz as the voice of The Foreman, 1998
 The Crow: Salvation as Peter Walsh, 2000
 Waltzing Anna as JD Reno, 2006
 The American Side as The Professor, 2016

Theater
 Torch Song Trilogy, Broadway, 1986
 Today, I Am a Fountain Pen as Pete Lisanti, Theater 890, 1986
 Writer's Block as David, Atlantic Theater, 2003
 After Ashley as David, Vineyard Theatre, 2005
 Thicker than Water (multiple roles), Ensemble Studio Theatre, 2008
 Relatively Speaking (multiple roles), Brooks Atkinson Theater, 2011

References

External links
 
 
 

1961 births
Living people
American male television actors
American male voice actors
American people of Irish descent
Male actors from Evanston, Illinois
University of Richmond alumni